Wembley Stadium railway station is a Network Rail station in Wembley, Greater London, on the Chiltern Main Line. It is the nearest station to Wembley Stadium, and is located a quarter of a mile (400 m) south west of the sports venue.

History

First Wembley Stadium station
It had one platform, and was situated on a loop which forked off the Chiltern Main Line between Neasden Junction and Wembley Hill station (now Wembley Stadium station, see below). It then curved round in a clockwise direction to regain the Chiltern Main Line at a point slightly closer to Neasden Junction. The connections faced London to allow an intensive service with no reversing. The station was renamed several times, becoming Wembley Stadium station in 1928. The station was last used on 18 May 1968 for the 1968 FA Cup Final between Everton v West Bromwich Albion, and was officially closed on 1 September 1969.

Traces of the line can be seen on maps and in aerial photographs. It was normally used only for passenger services for events at the stadium or the Empire Pool within the estate, built for the 1924-25 British Empire Exhibition. Temporary sidings led into the "Palace of Engineering" exhibition hall where both the Great Western Railway's locomotive Caerphilly Castle and the London and North Eastern Railway's Flying Scotsman were displayed, with each claimed by its owners to be the most powerful passenger locomotive in Britain.

Present station

On 20 November 1905 the Great Central Railway opened a new route for freight trains between Neasden Junction and Northolt Junction. Passenger services from Marylebone began on 1 March 1906, when three new stations were opened: Wembley Hill,  and South Harrow. On 2 April 1906 these services were extended to Northolt Junction.

Wembley Hill station was renamed Wembley Complex on 8 May 1978 in order to indicate its proximity to the nearby sports facilities, as well as to a recently opened conference centre, before getting its present name Wembley Stadium on 11 May 1987.  There were originally four tracks with the two platforms on passing loops outside the inner non-stop running lines; the current two-track layout dates from the 1960s. The 4 tracks were closed for a week by a  landslide in a cutting near the station from 18 February 1918.

Services
Train services are operated by Chiltern Railways and run from Marylebone towards High Wycombe and Birmingham Snow Hill.

The typical off-peak service is:
2 trains per hour to London Marylebone only
1 train per hour to Gerrards Cross calling at Sudbury Hill Harrow, Northolt Park, West Ruislip and Denham
1 train per hour to High Wycombe calling at South Ruislip, Gerrards Cross and Beaconsfield.

The service to central London is quicker than from other stations in the area. Trains can reach London Marylebone non-stop in ten minutes.

During busier periods (usually due to an event at the stadium) a seven carriage shuttle operates between Marylebone and Wembley Stadium using the turnback siding just west of the station to enable trains to quickly turn around to go back to London. There is an enhanced northbound service too, with trains travelling to Banbury, Birmingham and beyond making additional calls at the station.

Connections
London Buses routes 83, 92, 182, 223, 440, 483 and night route N83 serve the station.

It is bounded to the south by the Harrow Road (A404 road).

Gallery

Notes

External links

Wembley Stadium at Chiltern Railways

Railway stations in the London Borough of Brent
Former Great Central Railway stations
Railway stations in Great Britain opened in 1906
Railway stations served by Chiltern Railways
Wembley